This is a list of football clubs from Kosovo, sorted alphabetically by division.

Clubs by division

Ipko Superliga

1° League

2° League

3° League

Group A classifies teams from the Dukagjin Region.

Group B classifies teams from the Kosovë Region.

Women's League

Defunct Clubs

Notes and references
Notes:

 
Kosovo
Football clubs